The Fish River (Visrivier in Afrikaans, Fischfluss in German) is a river in Namibia.  It is 650 km long, flowing from the Naukluft Mountains 150 km to the Hardap Dam near Mariental. From there the flow is entirely blocked, all further flow downstream coming from tributaries downstream from the dam.  The flow of the river is seasonal; in winter the river can dry up completely.  Despite this, the river is the site of the spectacular Fish River Canyon, a canyon 160 km long, and at points as much as 550 m deep.

The outflow of the Fish River joins the Orange River at the border with South Africa about 100 km from the Atlantic Ocean.

References

Rivers of Namibia
Tributaries of the Orange River